Laguna Creek High School is a public high school located in Elk Grove, California, a suburban community near Sacramento, California established in 1994. It is home to various organizations and programs, including the rigorous International Baccalaureate Programme (IB), Green Energy Technology Academy (GETA), the Manufacturing Production Technology Academy (MPTA), and the Sports Careers Academy (SCA).

Green Energy Technology Academy
Students of the Green Energy Technology Academy (GETA) study the technology of renewable energy. These GETA students explore the concepts of energy extraction, conversion and transmission processes through complex, hands-on, project-based work. Depending on a their post secondary plans, students who graduate from the Green Energy Technology Academy will be prepared to enter two or four institutions of study, enter a technical training program or go directly to work in the Energy Sector.

Manufacturing Production Technology Academy
The Manufacturing Production Technology Academy (MPTA) program prepares students for a career in crafts work and engineering. Projects range from helpful community projects such as developing and manufacturing toys for children with cerebral palsy to developing basic engine automobiles. The department allows selected MPTA students to enter a program that provides hands-on opportunities.

Sports Career Academy
The Sports Career Academy (SCA) focuses on exposing students to careers in the sports industry, specifically Sports Medicine.  Additionally, sports-related themes are woven into academic classes to address students' interests.

Lambda Delta Rho
Lambda Delta Rho is an honor society developed within the Sports Careers Academy. This honor society promotes the principles of Leadership (Lambda), Discipline (Delta), and Respect (Rho) as the foundations for academic and personal success. Students may qualify for this honor society based on their academic performance each term, and may earn rewards as a result. To attain status in the honor society, students must earn a 2.5 GPA or higher and earn no F grades or Unsatisfactory marks in behavior. Within the honor society, there are 3 different levels. The lowest qualifying level is Rho status. A student may qualify for Rho status if they earn between a 2.5 GPA and a 2.99. The second level is Delta Status. A student may qualify as Delta for earning between 3.0 and a 3.49 GPA. The highest level is Lambda status. Students must earn a qualifying GPA of over 3.5 to achieve this level.

Extracurricular activities

Laguna Creek Marching Band and Color Guard 

The Laguna Creek HS Marching Band and Color Guard has seven core performance ensembles:
 Marching Band (fall semester)
 Color Guard (fall semester)
 Jazz Ensemble (fall and spring semester)
 Winter Guard (spring semester)
 Winter Percussion (spring semester)
 Symphonic Band (spring semester), and
 Wind Ensemble (spring semester)

The Marching Band and Color Guard compete in the fall as members of the Northern California Band Association (NCBA), in the Open or 6A division. Recent honors have included Sweepstakes Trophies for Field performance at the Franklin Invitational, Del Oro Band Spectacular, and Lodi Grape Bowl Classic in 2019.

The Laguna Creek Winter Guard competes in the Scholastic Open division of the California Color Guard Circuit (CCGC) based in Northern California, and in the open division of Winter Guard International (WGI). Past titles include Scholastic A Champions at the WGI Union City Regional in 2019, and CCGC National Scholastic A Champions in 2018. 

During the virtual 2021 WGI season, the Laguna Creek Winter Guard competed both within California and internationally. The team tied for first overall and was one of 11 teams in the entire circuit to receive the elusive "Master" rating. For the 2022 season, they will be attending the WGI Union City and Manhattan Beach regionals in California before attending the 2022 WGI World Championships in Dayton, Ohio for the first time in school history since joining the WGI circuit in 2016.

The Laguna Creek Winter Percussion Ensemble competes in the NCBA, CCGC, and NCPA circuits.

The Laguna Creek High School Marching Band and Color Guard also have alumni marching in Drum Corps International, the major and minor leagues of marching band. Groups that Laguna Creek alumni have been a part of include Golden Empire Drum and Bugle Corps, Blue Devils B Drum and Bugle Corps, Vanguard Cadets Drum and Bugle Corps, the Mandarins Drum and Bugle Corps, the Concord Blue Devils, and the Santa Clara Vanguard.

Theatre Company 
The first play (fall term) is generally a historic and classic play.

The second play (Winter term) is a student directed and written play.

The third play (spring term) is generally a musical.

Athletics 
Laguna Creek High School is home of the Cardinals. They are part of the Delta Valley League conference. In the 2008-2009 football season, they became Delta Valley League Champions. They finished the season with 9 wins and 4 losses (9-4). Laguna Creek's cross town rivals are the Franklin High School Wildcats and the Elk Grove High School Thundering Herd.

Notable alumni
 Casey Weathers - member of the 2008 Summer Olympics United States baseball team.
 Brad Kilby - former pitcher of the Oakland Athletics
 Danny Castillo - former UFC/WEC fighter, with team Alpha Male
 Jeremy Ross - Arizona Cardinals
 Maria Kang - Fitness advocate and founder of No Excuse Mom movement
 Jason Porter - Semi-Professional NBA player
James Alston - World Champion Bench Presser. National Bench Press record holder.

References

External links

 Official website

Laguna Creek
Public high schools in California
Elk Grove, California
1994 establishments in California